The ATM-72 is a steel cased circular North Korean anti-tank mine. It is similar to the Russian TM-46, with a thick wire carrying handle and a filling plug. The mine uses a four pronged fuze, downward pressure on any of the levers will trigger the mine. The lever action of the mine makes it resistant to overpressure and blast.

The mine is found in Sudan and Korea.

Specifications
 Diameter: 340 mm
 Height: 180 mm (with fuze)
 Weight: 13 kg
 Explosive content: 9 kg of Composition B

References
 Jane's Mines and Mine Clearance 2005-2006
 

Anti-tank mines
Land mines of North Korea